Nicaragua made its Paralympic Games début at the 2004 Summer Paralympics in Athens. Its sole representative, wheelchair athlete Mario Madriz, entered two events in athletics. Nicaragua did not take part in the 2008 Summer Games, and has never participated in the Winter Paralympics.

Full results for Nicaragua at the Paralympics

See also
 Nicaragua at the Olympics

References